Nicolò Zoagli was a statesman who became doge of the Republic of Genoa. He took office after his predecessor, Antoniotto di Montaldo, had to flee the city due to the conflict between the local nobility, in particular between the Mondaldo and Adorno families. Nicolò stayed in office until August 17 when he stepped down in favor of Antonio Guarco.

References

14th-century Doges of Genoa